Hope Brook Airport is an abandoned aerodrome located  east of Grand Bruit, at the Hope Brook Gold Mine, Newfoundland and Labrador, Canada.

References

Defunct airports in Newfoundland and Labrador